Richard Hayden may refer to:

 Richard Hayden (Pennsylvania politician) (born 1956), former member of the Pennsylvania House of Representatives
 Richard E. Hayden (born 1946), acoustics specialist
 Richard D. Hayden (1928–2017), member of the California legislature